Ahmed Haj Ali is an Eritrean politician who has held various posts within the Government of Eritrea. After serving as Minister of Labour and Human Welfare, he was moved to the post of Minister of Tourism in February 1997. He has subsequently served as Minister of Fisheries and Marine Resources. He was also the first Eritrean Representative at the United Nations.

As of 2011, he is Minister of Energy and Mines. He has signed mining agreements with companies from Western countries as well as China to facilitate the exploitation of Eritrea's mineral wealth.

References

External links
 Picture of Ahmed Haj Ali

Living people
Year of birth missing (living people)
People's Front for Democracy and Justice politicians
Government ministers of Eritrea
Permanent Representatives of Eritrea to the United Nations